Gabriel Velasco Gutiérrez (born February 1, 1986) is a former professional Mexican footballer and manager who last played for Potros UAEM, and currently manages Ángeles SUD F.C. Morelos.

References

1986 births
Living people
Mexican footballers
Association footballers not categorized by position
Place of birth missing (living people)
Deportivo Toluca F.C. players
Cruz Azul Hidalgo footballers
Potros UAEM footballers
Coras de Nayarit F.C. footballers